Melville is a crater on Mercury. It has a diameter of 154 kilometers. Its name was adopted by the International Astronomical Union (IAU) in 1976. Melville is named for the American novelist Herman Melville, who lived from 1819 to 1891.

References

Impact craters on Mercury